Ciepielów may refer to the following places in Poland:
 Ciepielów, Lubusz Voivodeship (west Poland)
 Ciepielów, Masovian Voivodeship (east-central Poland)
 Ciepielów, a village near Slonim, (Belarus)

See also
 Massacre in Ciepielów